Joseph Madsen (born September 1, 1989) is an arena football offensive lineman who is currently a free agent. He played college football at West Virginia. He was originally signed by the Pittsburgh Steelers as an undrafted free agent.

High school career
Madsen attended Chardon High School where he played both offensive tackle and defensive tackle. While at Chardon he recorded 59 total tackles, five sacks, 18 tackles-for-loss and forced four fumbles. During his sophomore season, Chardon reached the Ohio Reginal Finals where they lost to Nordonia. As a senior, he was selected First-team All-Ohio as an offensive tackle.

College career
Madsen attended West Virginia. While there he started 50 games and earned Second-team-All Big XII as a senior and appeared in the 2013 Senior Bowl.

He redshirt as a true freshman in 2008. In 2009, he started 13 games and 12 in 2010. In 2011, he started 13 games and was named All-Big East Second-team. As a senior, in 2012, he started 12 games, however, he was ruled academically ineligible for the Pinstripe Bowl. He was also named All-Big XII Second-team.

Professional career

Pre-draft

At the West Virginia Pro Day, Madsen chose not to re-attempt his 40-yard dash. However, he did re-attempt some other drills. He recorded a 27-inch vertical leap and an 8-foot-10 broad jump. In the running drills, Madsen ran a 4.86 short shuttle and a 7.58 second three-cone shuttle.

National Football League
On April 27, 2013, after going undrafted, Madsen was signed by the Pittsburgh Steelers.

On January 3, 2015 Madsen was signed by the Green Bay Packers to their practice squad.  On May 4, he was released by the Packers. On June 22, he was signed by the Cleveland Browns. He was signed when Tyler Loos informed the team he was retiring. He was released on August 16. On August 26, he was then signed by the Detroit Lions. He was released on September 5, 2015.

Arena Football League
After being released by the Steelers on August 31, 2013, he joined the Los Angeles Kiss for the 2014 season. For the season he appeared in 16 games and recorded one tackle as well as one reception for eight yards. He started the 2015 season, however, he was signed by the Browns and was placed on the other league exempt list.

He became an AFL free agent on November 5. Later that month, he joined the Cleveland Gladiators. On May 22, 2017, Madsen was placed on reassignment by the Gladiators.

On May 23, 2017, Madsen was claimed off waivers by the Washington Valor. On July 15, 2017, Madsen was placed on reassignment.

Personal life
Madsen was born to Eric and Reta Madsen. He has three older siblings.

Madsen currently resides in Twinsburg, Ohio.

References

External links

 ArenaFootball.com bio 
 West Virginia Mountaineers bio 
 Pittsburgh Steelers bio 
 Green Bay Packers bio 
 Cleveland Browns bio 
 Detroit Lions bio 
 Cleveland Gladiators bio 
 Joe Madsen profile by WVU News

1989 births
Living people
American football offensive linemen
West Virginia Mountaineers football players
Pittsburgh Steelers players
Los Angeles Kiss players
Cleveland Browns players
Detroit Lions players
Cleveland Gladiators players
Players of American football from Ohio
People from Chardon, Ohio
Green Bay Packers players
Washington Valor players
People from Twinsburg, Ohio